Măgura is a commune in Teleorman County, Muntenia, Romania. It is composed of two villages, Guruieni and Măgura.

References

Communes in Teleorman County
Localities in Muntenia